Manuel Maria Pais Jordão (5 November 1921 – deceased) was Portuguese footballer who played as a half-back.

Starting at Barreirense, Jordão joined Benfica in 1942, where he won two league titles.

Career
Born in Barreiro, Portugal, Jordão joined his home-town club, Barreirense at age 17, representing them for four seasons, before moving to Benfica in 1942. He made his debut for them on 25 October, against GD Fósforos. Despite competition from Alcobia, Albino and Francisco Ferreira, he still played 14 times, helping Benfica win the league and cup double. In 
1943–44, his playing time dropped to just one game, in the regional league.

Jordão won his second league title in the following year, thanks to the three games played in January 1944. He played more games in 1945–46, but  Benfica failed to win any silverware. He left the club in 1946 with 29 appearances and 2 goals.

Honours
Benfica
 Primeira Liga: 1942–43, 1944–45
 Taça de Portugal: 1939–40, 1942–43

References
General
 

Specific

1921 births
Year of death unknown
Sportspeople from Barreiro, Portugal
Portuguese footballers
Association football midfielders
Primeira Liga players
F.C. Barreirense players
S.L. Benfica footballers